Hvalur 9 RE-399 is an Icelandic whaling ship built in 1952 in Norway. It has been a part of the Icelandic whaling fleet operated and owned by the company Hvalur hf. since 1966.

In 1972 and again in 1973 she was requisitioned by the Icelandic Coast Guard, repainted, renamed Týr and armed with a 57 mm gun and subsequently used to cut the fishing gear from foreign fishing vessels fishing illegally (according to Icelandic law) in a newly claimed fishery zone during the Second Cod War. During her service in the Coast Guard she was nicknamed Hval-Týr by the Icelanders and Moby Dick by the British.

Between 1987 and 2006, while commercial whaling ceased in Iceland, the ship remained unused at pier but the recommencement of whaling in Iceland brought it back into action. As of 2022, the ship remains active.

References

External links
Skipaskrá - The Icelandic ship registry

1952 ships
Ships built in Norway
Whaling ships
Ships of Iceland
Whaling in Iceland
Patrol vessels of Iceland